Timeless is the third studio album and fifth solo album by Filipino actor Piolo Pascual. It was released on August 12, 2007.

Track listing

Awards
Gold Record Award

References

2007 albums
Star Music albums
Piolo Pascual albums